Ovçulu may refer to:
Ovçulu, Agdash, Azerbaijan
Ovçulu, Shamakhi, Azerbaijan

See also
 Ovcullu, Azerbaijan